Kruthivennu is a village in Krishna district of the Indian state of Andhra Pradesh.

See also 
Villages in Kruthivennu mandal

References 

Villages in Krishna district
Mandal headquarters in Krishna district